Dasharatha (IAST: Daśaratha; born Nemi) was the king of the Kosala kingdom and a scion of the Suryavamsha dynasty in Hinduism. He ruled from his capital at Ayodhyā. Dasharatha had three primary consorts: Kausalya, Kaikeyi, and Sumitra, and from these unions were born Shanta, Rama, Bharata, Lakshmana, and Shatrughna. He is mentioned in the Rāmāyana epic and the Vishnu Purana.

Legend

Early life 
King Dasharatha was believed to be an incarnation of Svayambhuva Manu, the son of the Hindu creator god, Brahma.

Dasharatha was the son of King Aja of Kosala and Indumati of Vidarbha. He was originally named Nemi, but he acquired the moniker Dasharatha ('ten chariots') as his chariot could move in all ten directions, fly, and return to earth, and he could fight with ease in all of these directions.

Dasharatha became the ruler of Kosala after the death of his father. He was a great warrior who subjugated many of the neighbouring kingdoms with his prowess and slew many asuras in battle.

According to the Ayodhyā Kāṇḍa of the Ramayana (in chapter 34, verses 10–13), King Dasharatha had around 350 wives, three of whom were his favourite queens: Kausalya was Dasharatha's chief queen, while Sumitra and Kaikeyi were his other favoured consorts. Kausalya hailed from the kingdom of Dakshina Kosala, Sumitra from Kashi, and Kaikeyi from the Kekeya Kingdom.

Yajñas to beget sons 

Dasharatha ruled over Ayodhyā, but he lacked a son to carry on his dynasty. He decided to perform an aśvamedha in order to beget a son. His counsellor and charioteer, Sumantra, told him of a prophecy that by bringing the sage R̥śyaśr̥ṅga to Ayodhyā, he would beget sons.

To fulfil the prophecy, Dasharatha traveled to Aṅga, where king Romapāda's daughter Śāntā was married to R̥śyaśr̥ṅga. Bringing R̥śyaśr̥ṅga to Kosala, he instructed the Brahmins to perform the aśvamedha. After the aśvamedha was properly performed, a Putrīyā Iṣṭi was performed for the attainment of sons.

During its performance, a figure emerged from the fire carrying a vessel of celestial porridge. The being told Dasharatha to give the porridge to his wives, and he gave half the porridge to Kausalyā, a half of a half to Sumitrā, half of what remained to Kaikeyī, and the remaining portion again to Sumitrā. Kausalyā gave birth to Rāma, Kaikeyī to Bharata, and Sumitra to the twins Lakṣmaṇa and Śatrughna.

Kaikeyi's boons 

A maid of Queen Kaikeyi named Manthara convinced her that the throne of Maharaja Dasharatha belonged to her son Bharata, and that her stepson—crown prince Rama (the hero of the Ramayana)—should be exiled from the kingdom. The ugly maid also reminded her of the promise made to her by Dasharatha when she saved him in the great war against the asuras: that she was promised 2 boons, with which she could make Bharata king. 
 
After this conversation, Kaikeyi reminded Dasharatha about the two boons he had yet to fulfill for her. She recalled the time when she saved him from the demons during a celestial battle against Sambasura, an enemy of both Indra and Dasharatha. During a fierce battle between the two, the wheel of Dasharatha's chariot broke and Sambasura's arrow pierced the king's armor and lodged in his chest. Kaikeyi, who was acting as Dasharatha's charioteer, quickly repaired the broken wheel and then drove the chariot away from the battlefield. She nursed the wounded king back to health. Touched by her courage and timely service, Dasharatha offered her two boons. However, Kaikeyi chose to ask for those boons later, and King Dasharatha was obliged to fulfill them.

Now, Kaikeyi demanded that Bharata be crowned king and that Rama be sent to the forest for fourteen years. Hearing this, Dasharatha fell into a swoon and passed the night in a pitiable condition in Kaikeyi's palace.

Killing of Shravana Kumara and death 

After Rama's departure to the forest, Dasharatha lay in his bed with a wailing Kaushalya. He suddenly remembered an incident which had occurred in his past. He narrated to Kausalya about how, by accident, he had killed a young man named Shravana, mistaking him to be a deer.

Dasharatha, who was then the crown prince, had gone hunting on the banks of River Sarayu. He was an expert in hunting by determining the direction of sound and heard the gurgle of an animal drinking water. Mistaking it to be deer, Dasharatha shot an arrow. He became mortified when he heard a human cry as the arrow found its target. Dasharatha hurried there to find a boy lying sprawled on the banks of the river with an arrow lodged in his chest. Dasharatha was aghast and profusely apologised to the young Shravana trying to revive and help him. The boy forgave Dasharatha for his unintentional, unrighteous act, and demanded that Dasharatha pull the arrow out of his chest. He also told him to take the pitcher of water to his blind parents, who must be waiting for him since they were thirsty because of all the travel. The boy died from his injury. Dasharatha approached the blind couple and told them about their son's unfortunate death. The parents, grief-stricken, cursed Prince Dasharatha: "Just as we are suffering and dying due to the separation from our beloved son, you too shall have the same fate."

Dasharatha concluded the chapter by saying that his end was near and the curse of Shravana's parents had taken effect.

References

External links

 Ramayana, translated in English by Griffith, from Project Gutenberg
 Ramayana by Valmiki
 Ramayana by Tulsidas

Ayodhya
Characters in the Ramayana
Solar dynasty